The Regia was a structure in the Forum of Ancient Rome, originally the residence of the Kings. Regia may also refer to:

Latin
 Aqua regia, mixture of concentrated nitric acid and concentrated hydrochloric acid 
 Regia Anglorum, British medieval reenactment organisation
 Bulla Regia, former Roman city near modern Jendouba, Tunisia
 Editio Regia, third and the most important edition of the Greek New Testament of Robert Estienne
 Via Regia, "King's Highway"
 "Vivas Schola Regia", song of the Royal High School of Edinburgh. 
 Regia, a classical type of building.

Italian
 Regia Marina, "Royal Navy" 1861-1946 
 Regia Aeronautica, "Royal Air Force" 1923-46
 Scala Regia, "Royal Staircase"
 Sala Regia (disambiguation), "Regal Room or Hall"

Spanish
 Fuerza Regia, Mexican professional basketball team based in Monterrey

See also
 Regis (disambiguation) (Latin "of the king")
 Regius (disambiguation) (Latin "royal" masculine adjective)
 Regium (disambiguation) (Latin "royal" neuter adjective)